is a 1953 Japanese drama film written and directed by Kaneto Shindō, based on an unfinished novel by Shūsei Tokuda.

Plot
Ginko, daughter of a poor shoemaker, is sold to work as a geisha in a brothel in Tokyo to support her family. Although made the madam after the death of the owner's wife, she suffers so much from the violence inflicted by the abusive owner, that her father buys her back. To help the family and her sick father, she starts working in a brothel in Hokkaido. There she meets a man who is seemingly willing to make Ginko his wife, but his upper-class family demands that he marries a woman of equal social status. Back in Tokyo working at still another brothel, she catches pneumonia and is carried home to die, but in the end her younger sister Tokiko dies and she lives. The last scene shows her again as a geisha, entertaining a group of customers.

Cast

References

External links
 

1953 films
1953 drama films
Japanese drama films
Japanese black-and-white films
Films based on Japanese novels
Films directed by Kaneto Shindo
Films scored by Akira Ifukube
1950s Japanese films
1950s Japanese-language films